Denver is  a community in the Canadian province of Nova Scotia, located in  the Municipality of the District of St. Mary's in Guysborough County. It may have been named for Denver, Colorado.

References

Denver on Destination Nova Scotia

Communities in Guysborough County, Nova Scotia
General Service Areas in Nova Scotia